Salim Salimov (born 5 May 1982) is an ethnic Turkish boxer from Bulgaria.

He participated in the 2004 Summer Olympics for his native European country. There he was stopped in the first round of the Light flyweight (48 kg) division by Thailand's Suban Pannon.

Salimov won the bronze medal in the same division six months earlier, at the 2004 European Amateur Boxing Championships in Pula.

External links
Yahoo! Sports

1982 births
Living people
Flyweight boxers
Boxers at the 2004 Summer Olympics
Olympic boxers of Bulgaria
Bulgarian male boxers
Bulgarian people of Turkish descent